Lumbay ng Dila (Tongue's Melancholy) is a novel written by Filipino author Genevieve L. Asenjo published in 2010. The novel is set mainly in Antique in the Western Visayas region of the Philippines and it tells the story of Sadyah Zapanta – Lopez. It received a special citation for Excellence in Fiction in a Philippine Language in the Juan C. Laya Prize in the 2011 Philippine National Book Awards.

Summary 
The novel tells the story of Sadyah Zapanta – Lopez, the granddaughter of Marcelo N. Lopez and the daughter of Leandro and Teresa Lopez. Marcelo N. Lopez was imprisoned after being accused as the mastermind of the Guinsang-an Bridge massacre.

Sadyah is an assistant professor in De La Salle University and she graduated from the University of the Philippines – Visayas with a degree in literature. The novel chronicles her search for love and happiness through her relationships with Stephen Chua, Ishmael Onos, Priya Iyer.

Characters 
Sadyah Zapanta – Lopez is an assistant professor in De La Salle University from Antique who currently lives in Manila. She seeks closure with her family about what really happened that night during the Guinsang-an Bridge massacre.

Marcelo N. Lopez is Sadyah's grandfather. He was imprisoned because he was accused of being the mastermind of the Guinsang-an Bridge massacre.

Leandro Lopez is the father of Sadyah and the husband of Teresa. During his days as a commander in the NPA, he was called Kumander Pusa. Pusa is the Tagalog word for cat and he was given this name because of his ability to escape death in many dangerous situations.

Teresa Lopez is the mother of Sadyah and the wife of Leandro. During her days as a commander in the NPA, she was called Kumander Rafflesia. Rafflesia is a kind of parasitic flower mainly found in southeast Asia.

Stephen Chua is Sadyah's first lover in the novel. She meets him online but they eventually decide to meet in person. Their relationship was more sexual than emotional, both of them seemingly detached from each other.

Ishmael Onos is Sadyah's second lover in the novel. He is a Muslim and Sadyah meets him in a Muslim–Christian forum.

Priya Iyer is Sadyah's third lover in the novel. He is an Indian corporate professional living in the building adjacent from Sadyah's building.

Auntie Fely and Uncle Lydio are Sadyah's aunt and uncle. Auntie Fely is the sister of Sadyah's father Leandro and uncle Lydio is her husband. They raised Sadyah after her parents left her in their care.

Nene and Bong Bong are Sadyah's cousins. They are the children of her auntie Fely and Uncle Lydio. Sadyah grew up with Nene and Bong Bong.

Reviews/Studies on Lumbay ng Dila 

For this was the root of our tongue's sorrow, the lumbay ng dila: that whatever we taste, and say, is not––and cannot be––fully ours.
-Edgar Calabia Samar

Very fresh approach in storytelling. Asenjo is said to be one of the new voices in Philippine literature.
-K.D Absolutely

I really enjoyed reading this novel because it brought out the Filipino woman within me. This novel caused me to have different emotions in a matter of time. Thus, I really recommend everyone, especially the Filipinos, to read this book.
-Abigail Punongbayan
Truly, Lumbay ng Dila left me in a state of wonder at how positive thinking and love can conquer all.

-Alissa Lim

-Isagani R. Cruz

-Jun Cruz Reyes

-Fanny A. Garcia

Although Lumbay ng Dila is Asenjo's first novel, her work shows that she already has mastery of the form as can be seen in the colorful and enduring story; tight structure and plot; interesting, believable, and vivid characterization; clearly delineated setting; timely and timeless ideas; appropriate choice and handling of point of view; and fresh and effective use of language.

-Gerardo Z. Torres

-John Clifford Sibayan

– Joseph Martin Jose

Other forms of media 

 Lumbay ng Dila Trailer – an unofficial trailer under the YouTube channel of Martin Angelo Ramirez 
 An illustrated comic by John Christoper Lim and Christian Kyle Fernin Can be found here

References

2010 novels
Philippine novels